The Central District of Darmian County is in South Khorasan province, Iran. At the National Census in 2006, its population was 21,409 in 5,163 households. The following census in 2011 counted 23,822 people in 6,166 households. At the latest census in 2016, the district had 23,550 inhabitants in 6,376 households.

References 

Darmian County

Districts of South Khorasan Province

Populated places in South Khorasan Province

Populated places in Darmian County